Philip Anthony Jones (born 21 February 1992) is an English professional footballer who plays for  club Manchester United. Before joining Manchester United, Jones played for Blackburn Rovers at both youth and senior levels. Although primarily a centre-back, he has also been used as a right-back or defensive midfielder.

Jones has represented England at various levels. He played for the under-19 team in 2009 before making his debut for the under-21 team in 2010. He made his debut for the England senior team in 2011, and represented his country at UEFA Euro 2012, and the 2014 and 2018 FIFA World Cups.

Early life
Jones was born in Preston, Lancashire, and grew up in nearby Clayton-le-Woods. He attended Balshaw's CE High School in Leyland, and played for the Ribble Wanderers under-10 team.

Club career

Blackburn Rovers
Jones joined the Blackburn Rovers youth team in 2002. He then joined the senior team for the 2009–10 Premier League season, signing a two-year professional contract. He made his first-team debut for Blackburn after starting the League Cup match against Nottingham Forest on 22 September 2009, in which Blackburn won 1–0. Then in February 2010, he signed a new five-year contract that included a £16 million release clause. Jones made his first Premier League start for Blackburn against Chelsea on 21 March, just a month after turning 18. He was widely praised for his committed and assured performance at centre-back, making several crucial blocks and interceptions as Rovers held the champions to a 1–1 draw at Ewood Park. In the 2009–10 season, he made nine league appearances, and three cup appearances.

The 2010–11 season started in promising fashion with Jones starting in the opening match of the campaign against Everton, and subsequently playing the majority of the club's matches in the first half of the season, albeit in an unfamiliar defensive midfield role. A torn knee cartilage injury in a match against West Ham United in December, threatened to rule him out for the remainder of the season. However, on 19 March 2011, he made his return from injury against Blackpool at Ewood Park coming on as a second-half substitute for Brett Emerton in a 2–2 draw. On 2 April 2011, Jones started a first-team match for the first time in four months against Arsenal at the Emirates Stadium, playing the full 90 minutes in a 0–0 draw. Despite his injury, he played 26 league matches, and two cup matches for Blackburn that season.

Manchester United

At the end of the 2010–11 season, Manchester United were reportedly interested in signing Jones. Alex Ferguson was apparently impressed with Jones' commitment and leadership skills at centre-back when Blackburn held United to a 1–1 draw on the day United clinched the title. On 13 June 2011, United confirmed that they had reached an agreement to sign Jones on a five-year deal for an undisclosed transfer fee believed to be at least £16.5 million; the deal would be finalised upon his return from international duty. He made his debut for the club on the 2011 pre-season tour to the United States, in United's 3–1 victory over Chicago Fire.

Jones made his competitive debut for United as a second-half substitute, replacing Rio Ferdinand in the 2011 FA Community Shield against rivals Manchester City. United were 2–0 behind, but won 3–2. Jones made his league debut a week later, again as a substitute replacing Ferdinand, as United beat West Bromwich Albion 2–1 on the opening weekend. On 10 September, Jones provided two assists for Wayne Rooney in United's 5–0 thumping of Bolton Wanderers at the Reebok Stadium. Jones started the away match to Liverpool as a box-to-box midfielder, different from his usual centre-back and full-back positions he was accustomed to. Jones scored his first ever senior goal on 3 December in a 1–0 away win against Aston Villa. Jones scored a consolation goal against Basel in a 2–1 Champions League defeat that resulted in United being knocked out of the competition, heading in a loose ball after Federico Macheda's shot had come back off the bar. On 21 December, he suffered a facial injury in an away match against Fulham, however the X-ray showed no serious damage and Jones returned to action in the 3–2 defeat against Blackburn on 31 December.

After suffering a back problem and having a knee operation which kept him out for the start of the 2012–13 season, Jones made his first appearance in an away match against Galatasaray in the Champions League on 20 November. He scored his first goal of the 2013–14 season on 29 October in a 4–0 win against Norwich City in the League Cup. On 10 December, he scored the only goal of the match in a 1–0 win against Shakhtar Donetsk in the final group-stage match of the Champions League, ensuring United finished top of the group.

On 1 July 2015, Jones signed a new four-year contract with United. On 8 February 2019, he signed a new contract until 2023. On 9 February, Jones assisted Anthony Martial in a 3–0 win over Fulham, his first goal involvement since 2014. On 26 January 2020, he scored in a 6–0 FA Cup win against Tranmere Rovers; it was his first goal for United since March 2014. He then spent 20 months injured, finally returning to training and playing with the reserves in September 2021. In September 2021, Jones opened up on his injury problems, stating "I think as a footballer, as a person, as a human being, that's the lowest I probably ever felt in my life". Following an injury to Harry Maguire, coupled with existing injuries to Eric Bailly and Victor Lindelöf, Jones made his return to first team action in a 1–0 home defeat to Wolverhampton Wanderers on 3 January 2022, his first appearance in nearly two years. Following the appointment of Erik ten Hag, Jones wasn't included in United's 25 man squad for the 2022–23 season; injury resulted in Jones missing the entirety of the season.

International career

Jones made his debut for the England under-19 team in the 3–1 win over Turkey on 17 November 2009. He appeared a further three times for the under-19s. On 4 August 2010, Jones was called up to the England under-21 squad. On 10 August, Jones won his first under-21 cap, starting for England against Uzbekistan. He was substituted in the 46th minute and was replaced by Liverpool's Martin Kelly. He was selected for the 2011 UEFA European Under-21 Championship in Denmark and was made captain by manager Stuart Pearce for the final group stage match against the Czech Republic.

On 5 August 2011, he was called up to the England senior team for the friendly against the Netherlands by Fabio Capello, but did not end up playing as the match was cancelled four days later by the Football Association after riots in London. On 7 October 2011, Jones made his debut for the England senior team in a 2–2 draw against Montenegro in UEFA Euro 2012 qualifying. After the match, Capello said Jones was "born with talent", and praised his performance. Jones was named in England's UEFA Euro 2012 squad by Capello's replacement Roy Hodgson. However, he did not make an appearance during the tournament.

On 12 May 2014, Jones was named in England's 23-man squad for the 2014 FIFA World Cup. Due to a shoulder injury, Hodgson took uncapped defender John Stones as standby for Jones, but he recovered before 2 June deadline. With England's elimination likely, Jones was given a tournament debut as a starter in the final group match, helping the team to a clean sheet in a 0–0 draw with Costa Rica in Belo Horizonte.

He was named in the 23-man England national team squad for the 2018 FIFA World Cup. He played two matches, both against Belgium (in the group stage and third place play-off), and both ended in defeat.

Style of play

Known for his physical power and build, Jones has been called a "jack of all trades" for his ability to play at centre-back, right-back or as a defensive midfielder. Despite the suggestion that his best position is centre-back, he often fills in at right-back. With his stocky build, opposition players have found it hard to bully Jones off the ball or out-muscle him.

Former Manchester United player Bobby Charlton has said that Jones evoked memories of the late Duncan Edwards, "If you talk to Bobby Charlton", says Pat Crerand, Charlton's teammate in United's 1967–68 European Cup-winning team, "Phil Jones reminds him of Duncan Edwards with his power and build."

In 2011, England manager Fabio Capello compared Jones to former A.C. Milan and Italy captain Franco Baresi, and former Real Madrid and Spain captain Fernando Hierro.

In 2013, Manchester United manager Sir Alex Ferguson offered perhaps the most glowing endorsement of Jones' abilities, saying "The way he is looking, he could be our best ever player. He may be one of the best players we have ever had, no matter where we play him. At 21 years of age, he is going to be a phenomenal player. He can play anywhere on the pitch. He has such a massive influence, with his instinct and reading of the game."

Later assessments of Jones' style were less flattering, with former Manchester United captain Roy Keane deeming Jones "not good at defending or [a] good defender". Jones was described by The Athletic as "someone who has become a running joke for football's LOL generation". In 2019, reflecting on Ferguson's 2013 endorsement of Jones, i noted that "in more than six years Jones has produced more internet memes, as he falls flat on his face or it contorts in an impossible expression, than convincing performances in a Manchester United shirt", while suggesting Ferguson's comments "could well be the biggest error of judgement he ever made in his career".

Career statistics

Club

International

Honours
Manchester United
Premier League: 2012–13
FA Cup: 2015–16
FA Community Shield: 2011, 2013
UEFA Europa League: 2016–17

References

External links

Profile at the Manchester United F.C. website

1992 births
Living people
People from Clayton-le-Woods
Footballers from Preston, Lancashire
English footballers
Association football defenders
Association football midfielders
Blackburn Rovers F.C. players
Manchester United F.C. players
Premier League players
FA Cup Final players
UEFA Europa League winning players
England youth international footballers
England under-21 international footballers
England international footballers
UEFA Euro 2012 players
2014 FIFA World Cup players
2018 FIFA World Cup players